Violeta "Viki" Miljković (born 18 December 1974) is a Serbian singer and television personality. Born in Niš, she started her recording career in the early nineties and has released ten albums to date. Since 2015, Viki has been a judge and mentor on the televised singing show Zvezde Granda.

Life and career 
Born and raised in Niš, Viki started performing as teenager alongside her brother who played accordion. After getting discovered by song-writing duo Marina Tucaković and Aleksandar Radulović, she released her debut album, Loša sreća (Bad Luck, 1992), under Diskos. However, it was only the following year that Viki saw significant commercial success with her second release and breakout hit "Nikom nije lepše nego nama" (No One Has It Better Than Us). Her music career peaked in the early 2000s with albums Mariš li (Do You Care, 2003) and Mahi, mahi (2005), released through Grand Production. In 2006, Viki held her first solo concert in Belgrade's Sava Centar.

Since 2015, she has appeared on the televised singing competition Zvezde Granda (Grand Stars) as a judge and mentor. In 2022, she had a winning contestant as a mentor with Nermin Handžić in season fifteen.

Miljković has been married to accordion player Dragan Tašković "Taške" since 2007, with whom she has a son, Andrej, born in October the same year. It has been noted that Miljković has close friendships with singers Ceca Ražnatović and Sanja Đorđević, who served as bridesmaids at her wedding. She graduated with a degree in musical arts from the Faculty of Arts, University of Pristina.

Discography
Studio albums
 Loša sreća (1992)
 Hajde, vodi me odavde (1994)
 Svadbe neće biti (1995)
 Tunel (1996)
 Kud puklo da puklo (1997)
 Okrećem ti leđa, tugo (1998)
 Godine (2001)
 Mariš li (2003)
 Mahi, mahi (2005)
 Ovde se ne plače (2009)

Compilations
 The best of (2011)

See also
 Music of Serbia
 List of singers from Serbia
 Turbo-folk

References

External links
 

1974 births
Living people
Musicians from Niš
Serbian turbo-folk singers
21st-century Serbian women singers
Grand Production artists
University of Pristina alumni